Basil Ivan Rákóczi (31 May 1908 – 21 March 1979) was an English artist born in London. He was a prominent and leading member of the Irish art group, the White Stag, along with Kenneth Hall.

Biography

Rákóczi was born on 31 May 1908 in Chelsea to Charlotte May Dobby and Ivan Rákóczi. His memories of his father relied mostly on fond reminiscences from his mother. Throughout his life he was proud of both his Irish heritage from his mother's side and his Hungarian heritage from his father's. He also held high regard for gypsy practices as his parents had been married in accordance to gypsy rites. Later in his life, he also rediscovered his Celtic roots.

Autobiography

Basil Rakoczi also wrote an autobiography that details his life in an imaginative but frank and honest way. There are currently no planned publications of this autobiography though an official biography is rumoured to being worked upon.

Style

His style varies greatly as he believed to explore psychological aspects of his work. A great many of his friends and contemporaries relied on psychology as a means of art and a number of his friends were members of the Society of Creative Psychology. As a result, his painting have a very modernist yet unique style that is only repeated within the group he formed and ran, The White Stag. He primarily used oil and gouache as a medium but frequently worked with monotype and watercolour and ceramics for tile designs.

Exhibitions and Public Collections

Basil Rákóczi's work has featured in over 150 exhibitions, of which more than 60 have been solo shows. His first commercial exhibition was in 1935 at the Artificer’s Guild in Cambridge and throughout his life, he had regular exhibitions at the Irish Museum of Living Art, the Royal Hibernian Academy and the Watercolour Society of Ireland.

More recently, in the summer of 2005, his paintings were featured at the Irish Museum of Modern Art along with other White Stag works in a successful exhibition. Further exhibitions are in planning at locations currently unknown.

He has art works in public collections across the globe including the University of Sussex, Derby City Art Gallery, Manchester City Art Gallery, Dublin's Trinity College, the Ulster Museum in Belfast, the Queensland Australia National Collection and Auckland City Art Gallery.

External links
The Official Basil Rákóczi Website
Irish Museum of Modern Art

1908 births
1979 deaths
English Quakers
20th-century English painters
English male painters
20th-century Quakers
English people of Hungarian descent
English people of Irish descent
Painters from London
20th-century English male artists